Anil Lad (born 7 December 1973) is an Indian Politician, who served as a Member of Parliament in Rajya Sabha the upper house of the Parliament of India, from the state of Karnataka. He also won 2013 Karnataka Legislative Assembly election from Bellary City Assembly constituency.

Early life and background 
Anil was born to Shri Heeroji V. Lad and Shrimati Sakkubai Heeroji Lad on 7 December 1973 in Sandur, Bellary District in Karnataka. He completed his education at Sandur Residential School in Sandur, Bellary District, Karnataka.

Personal life 
Anil Lad married Shrimati Aarti Anil Lad on 6 May 1999.

Position held

References

Indian National Congress politicians from Karnataka
Living people
Corruption in Karnataka
Indian prisoners and detainees
Karnataka MLAs 2004–2007
Karnataka MLAs 2013–2018
People from Bellary district
Rajya Sabha members from Karnataka
Year of birth missing (living people)